Ruhaniyat – The All India Sufi & Mystic Music Festival  is a music festival held in across India. It is organised by Mumbai-based cultural organisation Banyan Tree Events between November and March every year. This Sufi festival is one of the biggest of its kind, and is held in Mumbai, Delhi, Bangalore, Chennai, Kolkata, Pune and Hyderabad. Musicians from various parts of India — sufi qawwals, mystic musicians, Kabir panthis, and Bauls — perform at the festival.

History 
The Ruhaniyat festival started in 2001, the brainchild of Mahesh Babu and Nandini Mahesh, the Directors of Banyan Tree Events, to promote sufi and mystic music has evolved into a prestigious event.

The festival
Ruhaniyat means Soulfulness. The festival features the best of maestros in classical, folk and sufi music, discovered from the interiors of remote Indian villages, Turkey, Egypt, Syria etc.

Performers
Parvathy Baul, Warsi Brothers, Ateeq Hussain Khan, Jari Sufi compositions of Azan Fakir of Manipur, Hafiza Begum Chaudhury, Kabirpanthis Prahlad Tippania from Devas in Madhya Pradesh, Jagar music by Rakesh Bhatt, Vithal Rao etc.

Gallery

See also

References

External links

 
 A blog on Ruhaniyat 
   

Hindustani classical music festivals
Sufi music
Festivals in Hyderabad, India
Folk festivals in India
Tourist attractions in Hyderabad, India
Music festivals established in 2001
Islamic music festivals